The Imperiali quota is a formula used to calculate the minimum number, or quota, of votes required to capture a seat in some forms of single transferable vote or largest remainder method party-list proportional representation voting systems. It is distinct from the Imperiali method, a type of highest average method. It is named after Belgian senator Pierre Imperiali.

The Czech Republic and Ecuador are among the few countries that currently use this allocation system, while Italy used it for its Chamber of Deputies from 1946 to 1993. 

If many party lists poll just over the Imperiali quota, it is possible for this method to distribute more seats than there are vacancies to fill (this is not possible with the Hare or Droop quotas). If this occurs, the result needs to be recalculated with a higher quota (usually the Droop quota). If it does not happen, Imperiali usually distributes seats in a similar fashion to the D'Hondt method.

The imperiali quota should not be confused with the highest average method, which is also called Imperiali.

Formula
The Imperiali quota may be given as:

Total votes = the total valid poll; that is, the number of valid (unspoilt) votes cast in an election.
Total seats = the total number of seats to be filled in the election.

An example of use in STV
To see how the Imperiali quota works in an STV election imagine an election in which there are two seats to be filled and three candidates: Andrea, Carter and Brad. There are 100 voters as follows:

There are 100 voters and 2 seats. The Imperiali quota is therefore:

To begin the count the first preferences cast for each candidate are tallied and are as follows:

Andrea: 65
Carter: 15
Brad: 20

Andrea has more than 25 votes. She therefore has reached the quota and is declared elected. She has 40 votes more than the quota so these votes are transferred to Carter, as specified on the ballots. The tallies therefore become:

Carter: 55
Brad: 20

Carter has now reached the quota so he is declared elected. The winners are therefore Andrea and Carter.

References

Electoral system quotas